Three ships in the United States Navy have been named USS Perkins for George Hamilton Perkins (1836–1899).

 The first  was a modified  launched in 1909, served in World War I and decommissioned in 1919.
 The second  was a  launched in 1935, served in World War II and sank following a collision with Australian troopship Duntroon in 1942.
 The third  was a  launched in 1944 and sold to Argentina in 1973.

United States Navy ship names